The UMass Minutemen college football team competes as part of the National Collegiate Athletic Association (NCAA) Division I Football Bowl Subdivision (FBS), representing the University of Massachusetts Amherst as an Independent. UMass began play in 1879 and have since appeared in two major bowl games. As they spent most of their existence since the late 1970s as a Football Championship Subdivision program, they participated in the DI-AA/FCS playoffs rather than postseason bowl games. In 2013, the team once again became eligible for bowl games upon the completion of their transition to FBS.

Bowl games

References

UMass Minutemen
 
UMass Minutemen bowl games